Kim Cheol-su (born 20 September 1980) is a South Korean speed skater. He competed in two events at the 2002 Winter Olympics.

References

1980 births
Living people
South Korean male speed skaters
Olympic speed skaters of South Korea
Speed skaters at the 2002 Winter Olympics
Place of birth missing (living people)
Speed skaters at the 2003 Asian Winter Games